Matthew John William Crossley (born 18 March 1968) is an English former footballer who played as a central defender.

Playing career
Born in Basingstoke, Crossley played for Aldershot, Basingstoke Town, Newbury Town, Overton United, Wycombe Wanderers, Rushden & Diamonds, Kingstonian and Aldershot Town.

Management career
Crossley was appointed assistant manager at Woking in November 2002, to work alongside Glenn Cockerill.

During Woking's 1-0 victory over York City on 29 December 2006, Crossley head-butted York substitute James Dudgeon, after he had tried to intervene as a peacemaker during a touchline tussle between Neal Bishop and Woking's Danny Bunce. Crossley and Cockerill were sacked by Woking in March 2007.

Honours
Wycombe Wanderers
FA Trophy: 1990–91, 1992–93

References

External links

1968 births
Living people
Sportspeople from Basingstoke
English footballers
Association football defenders
Wycombe Wanderers F.C. players
Kingstonian F.C. players
Aldershot Town F.C. players
Andover F.C. players
English Football League players
National League (English football) players
Footballers from Hampshire